Archibaccharis is a genus of flowering plants in the family Asteraceae.

 Species
Archibaccharis is native to Mexico and Central America.

References

Asteraceae genera
Astereae
Flora of North America